Muhammad Rafli Mursalim (born 5 March 1999) is an Indonesian professional footballer who last plays as a striker for Liga 2 club Gresik United.

Club career

Mitra Kukar
Was born in Tangerang, Rafli started his professional career with Mitra Kukar in 2018. He made his professional debut on 11 May 2018 in a match against Bali United at the Aji Imbut Stadium, Tenggarong. Rafli made 22 league appearances and scored 4 goals for Mitra Kukar.

Persija Jakarta
In 2020, Rafli signed a contract with Indonesian Liga 1 club Persija Jakarta.

Sulut United (loan)
He was signed for Sulut United to play in the Liga 2 in the 2020 season, on loan from Persija Jakarta. This season was suspended on 27 March 2020 due to the COVID-19 pandemic. The season was abandoned and was declared void on 20 January 2021.

Dewa United (loan)
He was signed for Dewa United to play in the Liga 2 in the 2021 season, on loan from Persija Jakarta.

PSG Pati (loan)
In 2021, Rafli signed a contract with Indonesian Liga 2 club PSG Pati on loan from Persija Jakarta. He made his league debut on 4 October against PSCS Cilacap at the Manahan Stadium, Surakarta. Rafli played three times for PSG Pati in 2021 Liga 2 without scoring a goal.

International career
He made his debut for Indonesia U-19 in the 2017 AFF U-19 Youth Championship on September 7, 2017 against Philippines U-19. Rafli success made his first international goals for Indonesia, where he scoring one goal in the 90+1 minute from a penalty kick.

Career statistics

Club

Honours

International 
Indonesia U-19
 AFF U-19 Youth Championship third place: 2017, 2018

References

External links
 Rafli Mursalim at Soccerway
 Rafli Mursalim at Liga Indonesia

1999 births
Indonesian footballers
Living people
People from Tangerang
Sportspeople from Banten
Mitra Kukar players
Liga 1 (Indonesia) players
Indonesia youth international footballers
Association football forwards
Dewa United F.C. players